The former Merthyr Synagogue is located on Bryntirion Road in the Thomastown section of Merthyr Tydfil, Wales. It is a Grade II listed building and is the oldest purpose-built synagogue still standing in Wales.

History
The Jewish congregation of Merthyr was established in 1848 at a time when Merthyr Tydfil was a centre of the industrial revolution and the largest town in Wales. The new congregation called itself the "Merthyr Tydfil Hebrew Congregation", and erected its first synagogue in 1852–1855 in John Street. That first building was demolished in the 1990s.

The 1855 building was replaced by the prosperous congregation with the surviving synagogue building in 1877. The congregation had 27 head-of-household members in 1900. The 2011 census recorded four.

The congregation, which had been dwindling, rededicated the synagogue in 1955. In the 1980s, the synagogue was closed and the building was sold and became the Merthyr Christian Centre. In 2006 the former synagogue was in use as a gymnasium. It came out of use in 2004. In 2008 there was a plan to convert the building into eight residential apartments whilst preserving the exterior of this building.

In 2019 it was bought by the Foundation for Jewish Heritage and is planned to open as a Jewish Heritage Centre in 2025. Essential repairs were undertaken in 2021, part funded by Cadw, to make the building weather-proof.

Architecture
The synagogue is a stone building designed in Gothic Revival style, as were the former synagogues of Llanelli and Pontypridd. Unlike the "simple," "charming" Gothic synagogues that once graced Llanelli and Pontypridd, however, the synagogue of Merthyr Tydfil is a "Disneyland" fantasy of a building that architectural historian Sharman Kadish calls a "double-turreted Gothic folly" of a building. Kadish considers the Merthyr Synagogue to be "architecturally speaking one of the most important synagogues in the UK." 
The building is four storeys high, five when the raised basement is counted. It is crowned by a high gable two storeys tall, capped with stone finials. A double stone staircase rises to the Gothic entrance door. Two storeys above the door there is a pair of Gothic pointed-arch windows. Flanking the door and pointed-arch windows, a pair of hexagonal, stone turrets rise three storeys and are topped with hexagonal, conical roofs pointing skyward. As of 2006 the former Torah Ark has been moved into the raised basement where it was being preserved.

The gable is complete with a Welsh dragon; Merthyr may be the only synagogue in the world to feature a dragon perched on the front gable.

It was designed by a local architect named Charles Taylor. The design was influenced by contemporary buildings such as Castell Coch.

In 1960 it was painted by L. S. Lowry. He had painted many places of worship and was visiting Wales at the time. The painting was sold for £277,000 in March 2022.

In 1978 the building was given Grade II* listing, changed to Grade II in 1983.

See also
Oldest synagogues in the United Kingdom

References

External links
 Merthyr Tudfil Jewish Community and Merthyr Tydfil Synagogue on Jewish Communities and Records – UK (hosted by jewishgen.org).

Synagogues in Wales
Former synagogues in the United Kingdom
Gothic Revival synagogues
Religious organizations established in 1848
Synagogues completed in 1855
Grade II listed buildings in Merthyr Tydfil County Borough 
Grade II listed religious buildings and structures 
1848 establishments in Wales
Gothic Revival architecture in Wales
Former religious buildings and structures in Wales